

Events
March 5 – The American-German piano company Steinway & Sons is founded by Heinrich Engelhard Steinweg.
October – Louis Niedermeyer reorganizes and re-opens the school known as the École Choron, which becomes the École Niedermeyer.
October 1 – The piano manufacturer C. Bechstein Pianofortefabrik is founded by Carl Bechstein in Berlin.
October 22 – The overture to Tannhäuser is performed in Boston Music Hall by the Germania Musical Society conducted by Carl Bergmann. It is the first American performance. 
November 1 – Richard Wagner begins composing the music for The Ring of the Nibelung.
Louis Moreau Gottschalk returns the United States after eleven years in Europe.
Brahms meets Joseph Joachim and Robert and Clara Schumann.
Julius Blüthner founds Blüthner (piano manufacturer) in Leipzig, Germany.

Published popular music
 Danmarks gamle Folkeviser collected by Svend Grundtvig
 "Farewell My Lilly Dear" by Stephen Foster
 "My Cottage Home" w.m. Alice Hawthorne
 "My Old Kentucky Home" by Stephen Foster
 "P'tit quinquin" (in Picard) by Alexandre Desrousseaux
 "The Yellow Rose of Texas"

Classical music
Franz Berwald
Piano Trio No. 4 in C major
Piano Quintet No. 1 in C minor
Johannes Brahms – Piano Sonata No. 1, Piano Sonata No. 3
Ida Henriette da Fonseca 
Der Abschied
Byrons Statue
Die Erwartung
Granen ved Lougen
Regnbuen
Wechsellied zum Tanze
Zum neuen Jahr
William Henry Fry – Santa Claus, Christmas Symphony
Louis Moreau Gottschalk – The Banjo, Op. 15
Charles Gounod – Méditation sur le Premier Prélude de Piano de S. Bach, later known as Ave Maria (Bach/Gounod)
Franz Liszt
Piano Sonata in B minor
Hungarian Rhapsodies 1–15
Camille Saint-Saëns
Piano Quartet in E major
Symphony No. 1 in E♭ major
Robert Schumann, Johannes Brahms and Albert Dietrich – F-A-E Sonata
Henryk Wieniawski – Violin Concerto No. 1

Opera
Victor Massé – Les noces de Jeannette
Karel Miry – Anne Mie (opera in 1 act, premiered on October 9 in Antwerp)
Giuseppe Verdi
Il trovatore (premiered on January 19 at Teatro Apollo in Rome)
La traviata (premiered on March 6 at La Fenice in Venice)

Births
May 17 – Carolina Östberg, opera singer (d. 1929)
July 24 – Alessandro Parisotti, composer and music editor (d. 1913)
November 23 – Giuseppina Bozzachi, ballerina (d. 1870)
December 22 – Teresa Carreño, pianist, singer, conductor and composer (d. 1917)
December 30 – André Messager, composer (d. 1929)
date unknown 
Alfonso Rendano, pianist (d. 1931)
Maria Westberg, ballerina (d. 1893)

Deaths
January 16 – Matteo Carcassi, guitarist and composer (b. 1792)
March 15 – Giovanni Ricordi, violinist (b. 1785)
October 3 – George Onslow, composer (b. 1784)
October 29 – Pierre-Joseph-Guillaume Zimmermann, pianist, composer and music teacher (b. 1785)
October 30 – Pietro Raimondi, composer (b. 1786)
December 5 
Johann Peter Heuschkel, oboist, organist and composer (b. 1773)
Jeanette Wässelius, operatic soprano
date unknown – James Hill, folk musician (b. c. 1811)

 
19th century in music
Music by year